The R808 road is a regional road in Dublin, Ireland.

The official definition of the R808 from the Roads Act 1993 (Classification of Regional Roads) Order 2006 states:

R808: Artane - Clontarf, Dublin

Between its junction with R107 at Malahide Road and its junction with R807 at Clontarf Road via Gracefield Road, Brookwood Avenue, Sybil Hill and Vernon Avenue all in the city of Dublin.

See also
Roads in Ireland
Regional road

References

Regional roads in the Republic of Ireland
Roads in County Dublin